Crowell Mitchell House is a historic home located at Batesburg-Leesville, Lexington County, South Carolina. It was built in the 1880s and is a two-story, frame Victorian dwelling. The front facade features ornamental double-tiered porches which connect flanking bays. It is representative of a typical middle-class residence with spacious simple rooms, large window area, and scrollwork balustrades.

It was listed on the National Register of Historic Places in 1982.

References

Houses on the National Register of Historic Places in South Carolina
Victorian architecture in South Carolina
Houses completed in 1885
Houses in Lexington County, South Carolina
National Register of Historic Places in Lexington County, South Carolina